Trabzon is an electoral district of the Grand National Assembly of Turkey. It elects 6 members of parliament (deputies) to represent the province of the same name for a four-year term by the D'Hondt method, a party-list proportional representation system.

Members 
Population reviews of each electoral district are conducted before each general election, which can lead to certain districts being granted a smaller or greater number of parliamentary seats. Trabzon's seat allocation has fluctuated over the last thirty years between six, seven and eight seats. This was last revised downwards to 6 seats ahead of the 2011 vote.

There are currently six sitting members of parliament representing Trabzon: four from the governing party and two from opposition parties.

General elections

2018

November 2015

June 2015

2011

2007

2002

1999

1995

1991

1987

1983

Presidential elections

2014

References 

Electoral districts of Turkey
Politics of Trabzon Province